Anatolie is a Romanian-language male given name, primarily used in Moldova, shared by the following people:

Anatolie (Botnari), a bishop of the Moldovan Orthodox Church under the Moscow Patriarchate
Anatolie Arhire, a Moldovan politician, member of the Parliament of Moldova since 2009
Anatolie Boeștean (born 26 March 1985) is a Moldovan football player
Anatolie Cîrîcu (born 14 September 1988), a Moldovan weightlifter
Anatolie Dimitriu (born 19 June 1973) is a politician from Moldova, member of the Parliament of Moldova
Anatolie Doroș (born 21 March 1983), a Moldovan international footballer
Anatolie Ghilaș (born 23 January 1957, Pereni) is a Moldovan politician who has been a member of the Parliament of Moldova between 2009 and 2011
Anatolie Golea, a journalist from the Republic of Moldova
Anatolie Guidea, a Moldovan-born Bulgarian wrestler
Anatolie Moraru (born 1894) was a Bessarabian politician, member of the Moldovan Parliament (1917–1918)
Anatolie Onceanu is a Moldovan politician, member of the Parliament of Moldova (2005–2009)
Anatolie Ostap (born 22 November 1979) is a retired Moldovan footballer
Anatolie Popa, a Moldavian military commander 
Anatolie Prepeliță, a Moldovan professional footballer
Anatolie Urecheanu, a Moldovan diplomat, Ambassador to China

See also
Anatol
Anatoly

Romanian masculine given names